Congregation Beth Israel is a Reform synagogue located at 751 San Juan Boulevard in Bellingham, Washington. It is one of the oldest synagogues in Western Washington. 

Formally established in 1908, the congregation consisted mostly of Jewish immigrants from Lithuania. It moved into its first building at 2200 Broadway in 1925. Originally Orthodox, it became more liberal following World War II, and in 1987 joined the Union of American Hebrew Congregations. The congregation moved into a new building at 751 San Juan Boulevard in 2018. At that time membership was 275 families.

 the rabbi was Joshua Samuels.

Notes 

1908 establishments in Washington (state)
Ashkenazi synagogues
Buildings and structures in Bellingham, Washington
Jewish organizations established in 1908
Lithuanian-Jewish culture in the United States
Reform synagogues in Washington (state)
Synagogues completed in 1925
Synagogues completed in 2018